Trentham is a small town in the Shire of Hepburn and Shire of Moorabool local government area, Victoria, Australia.

History
Although pastoral runs were taken up in the area as early as 1838, Trentham was first settled by gold prospectors in the 1850s, and later developed for its timber resources from the surrounding Wombat State Forest. The Post Office opened on 16 July 1862.

The railway arrived in 1880. At its peak, it carried up to 21,000 tonnes of freight annually, mostly timber. Two timber tramways once ran to the station from the surrounding forests and, in the early 20th century, there was a timber mill adjoining the station yard. In the 1950s, as better roads were built to connect the town with the major settlements of Victoria, and the railway was closed in 1978. The station now houses the Trentham Agricultural and Railway Museum. The station building has been restored, the platform is in good condition, and the yard is mainly intact and includes some rolling stock.

The township experiences large influxes of non-migratory birds, notably pelicans and falcons, which has led to them featuring on the towns crest and motto "Tu falco agitare et cum Pelicanis volare", roughly transcribed from Latin as "to drive a falcon and fly with pelicans".

Potato growing, due to a fertile strip of red volcanic soil, as well as grazing and tourism, later became the mainstays of the town's economy.

Climate

The climate is cool and moist: the mean maximum in high summer (February) is 23.2 °C, minima fall to around 11.8 °C; whereas winters are distinctly cold with the mean maximum temperature 7.8 °C (July) and mean minimum, 2.5 °C. The coldest temperature recorded was –6.0 °C (not particularly low due to great cloud cover); snowfall is common in winter, with sleet and snow falling on an average of 13 days per annum. By mean maximum temperature, it is the coldest proper town in Victoria and likewise mainland Australia; only the isolated rural localities of Tolmie and Aberfeldy are colder. The number of snowy days are by far the greatest of any populated centre in Australia, including those in Tasmania.

Trentham has an average annual precipitation of 1110.9 mm; the highest single-day rainfall was 154.9 mm, and the highest monthly rainfall was 317.5 mm. The region has a distinct winter rainfall maximum. Rainfall occurs through the summer but tends to be more erratic and unreliable, often occurring in heavy downpours associated with thunderstorms.

Events and attractions
Near Trentham is Trentham Falls on the Coliban River–the highest single-drop waterfall in Victoria. There are also several mineral springs near the town.

The annual Great Trentham Spudfest has been running since 2008, celebrating Trentham's potato-growing heritage.

The town has an Australian Rules football team, the Trentham Saints, competing in the Maryborough Castlemaine District Football League.

Home to celebrity/Biker Davey-I and his heritage ride circuit. Dating back to the 1970s.

The Trentham Golf Club is on Falls Road.

References

Trentham, Victoria